Senator Gore may refer to:

Members of the United States Senate
Al Gore (born 1948), U.S. Senator from Tennessee from 1985 to 1993
Albert Gore Sr. (1907–1998), U.S. Senator from Tennessee from 1953 to 1971
Christopher Gore (1758–1827), U.S. Senator from Massachusetts from 1813 to 1816
Thomas Gore (1870–1949), U.S. Senator from Oklahoma from 1907 to 1921 and from 1931 to 1937

United States state senate members
David Gore (1827–1911), Illinois State Senate
Louise Gore (1925–2005), Maryland State Senate